The Bulgarian National Television is the public broadcaster of Bulgaria.

BNT may also refer to:

Language
Bantu languages, spoken in Sub-Saharan Africa (ISO 639-5 code: bnt)
Bridge and tunnel, a pejorative term for commuters into Manhattan, New York

Businesses and organizations
BioNTech, a German biotechnology company
Brand New Theatre, an American student theater company in Los Angeles

Other uses
Bicentennial National Trail, foot/horseback trail along Australia's eastern side
Brunei Darussalam Time, time in Brunei